American Dollar Bill – Keep Facing Sideways, You're Too Hideous to Look at Face On (Japanese: , and occasionally shortened to just American Dollar Bill) is a collaborative album between Japanese free improvisation/noise music artist Keiji Haino and American post-metal band Sumac. Serving as Haino's 86th and Sumac's third studio album, American Dollar Bill was released on February 23, 2018 through Thrill Jockey.

Background and production 
Sumac frontman Aaron Turner first saw Keiji Haino perform live nearly 20 years before the recording sessions for American Dollar Bill – Keep Facing Sideways, You're Too Hideous to Look at Face On. Turner was a fan of Haino's music and personal image, and reached out to Haino after some of his friends encouraged him to email his manager. All members of Sumac entered the studio with Haino in June 2017 to record "a series of unrehearsed, completely non-premeditated sessions". By Haino's request, the group performed two improvised sessions: one practice session and a second, entirely different session that would become an album. They recorded over an hour's worth of music across three tracks (two of which were separated into two parts) that became American Dollar Bill.

Reception 

American Dollar Bill received widespread acclaim from critics. At Metacritic, which assigns a normalized rating out of 100 to reviews from mainstream publications, the album received an average score of 81, based on nine reviews. Aggregator Album of the Year gave the release a 75 out of 100 based on a critical consensus of 9 reviews. Spin listed the album on their "15 Experimental Albums We Loved in 2018" list.

Track listing 
Titles and lyrics by Keiji Haino. Title translations by Alan Cummings. Music by Haino and Sumac.

Personnel 
Album personnel adapted from CD liner notes.

Band 
 Keiji Haino – guitar, vocals, flute
 Aaron Turner – guitar 
 Nick Yacyshyn – drums
 Brian Cook – bass

Production 
 Kondoh Yoshiaki – recording
 Kurt Ballou – mixing
 James Plotkin – additional mixing, track edits, mastering

Artwork and design 
 Aaron Turner – artwork, design
 Faith Coloccia – design 
 Takeshi – photographs

References 

2018 albums
Sumac (band) albums
Thrill Jockey albums
Collaborative albums